Andriy Protsyk (born 17 July 1986) is a professional Ukrainian footballer, who currently plays for KS Kiselow in Poland. He played for FC Karpaty Lviv in the Ukrainian Premier League. On March 2007, FC Karpaty Lviv broke their contract with Protsyk, and was granted a free-agent status, which he used to sign for FC Korosten where he played for one season before moving to Poland at  Wisla Pulawy.

External links
 ffu.org.ua
 en.eufo.de

Photos
 

1986 births
Living people
Place of birth missing (living people)
Ukrainian footballers
Wisła Puławy players
Association football defenders
Sportspeople from Lviv